Paulo Daniel Valente Moreira (born 17 February 2000) is a Portuguese footballer who plays for Felgueiras as a midfielder.

Club career
Paolo Moreira made his professional debut for Varzim on 8 November 2020 in the Liga Portugal 2.

On 29 July 2021, Moreira joined Felgueiras.

References

External links

2000 births
Living people
People from Marco de Canaveses
Portuguese footballers
Portugal youth international footballers
Association football midfielders
R.D. Águeda players
Varzim S.C. players
Sport Benfica e Castelo Branco players
F.C. Felgueiras 1932 players
Liga Portugal 2 players
Campeonato de Portugal (league) players
Sportspeople from Porto District